Sergey Mikhaylov (born 8 June 1978) is a retired Belarusian professional footballer. As of 2015, he works as a goalkeeper coach for Slutsk.

Honours
Belshina Bobruisk
Belarusian Premier League champion: 2001
Belarusian Cup winner: 2000–01

References

External links

Profile at teams.by

1978 births
Living people
Belarusian footballers
FC Slutsk players
FC Belshina Bobruisk players
FC Partizan Minsk players
FC Molodechno players
FC Smorgon players
FC Rechitsa-2014 players
FC Veras Nesvizh players
Association football goalkeepers
FC Osipovichi players